The Shadow is a 1954 Italian melodrama film directed by Giorgio Bianchi and starring Märta Torén and Pierre Cressoy.

Plot 
Lamont Cranston, a psychiatrist on retainer to the police department, is asked to assist in the Case of the Cotton Kimono murder investigation. Lamont and his girlfriend Margot Lane are not satisfied with Detective Harris' analysis and call on the two prime suspects: the victim's voice instructor and her boyfriend. When Harris, convinced that the boyfriend is guilty, frames the young man for the crime, Lamont is forced to assume his secret identity as "The Shadow", and cloaked by his power of invisibility, seeks to force the true killer to reveal himself.

Cast 

Märta Torén as Alberta
Pierre Cressoy as  Gerardo
Gianna Maria Canale as  Elena
Filippo Scelzo as Dr. Magre
Paolo Stoppa as  Michele
Emma Baron as Luisa
Renato Navarrini

References

External links

Italian drama films
1954 drama films
Films directed by Giorgio Bianchi
Films scored by Carlo Rustichelli
1954 films
Italian black-and-white films
Melodrama films
1950s Italian films